Oliver Horgan (born 17 February 1968) is an Irish football manager, he was the manager of Finn Harps from November 2013 to November 2022. Horgan has previously managed the Republic of Ireland national schoolboy football team. In December 2022, Horgan was announced as assistant manager at Galway United, ahead of the 2023 First Division season.

Managerial career

Fanad United
Horgan started his managerial career with Fanad United in the Ulster Senior League whom he led to three titles. Fanad entered an under-19 team into the inaugural 2011 season and Horgan took charge of the side until his departure from the club to join Finn Harps in 2013.

Finn Harps
On 26 November 2013, Horgan was appointed as the surprise successor to Peter Hutton as Finn Harps new manager for the 2014 season. Horgan's appointment came as a surprise to the sporting public of Donegal, with more high-profile candidates such as Joe Boyle, Don O'Riordan and Julian Dicks all confirmed to have been interested in the job.

In his first season as a League of Ireland manager, Horgan spent the year consolidating and making sure Harps would build on a youthful squad. Despite a good start to the season, Harps ended the year disappointingly in fifth position, a full seventeen points away from a play-off place. Despite the lack of success in the league, Horgan led Harps to a first FAI Cup semi-final appearance since an ill-fated run to the 1999 FAI Cup Final. Harps were drawn away to St Patrick's Athletic in Richmond Park
However, the game didn't go according to plan and underdogs Harps suffered a heavy 6–1 defeat to their opponents in front of the RTÉ cameras.

The 2015 season, however, proved much more successful for Horgan's Harps. A positive start to the 2015 season saw his team unbeaten in the first twelve matches of the season, only ended by a narrow 1–0 defeat away to Athlone Town on 5 June. However, Harps recovered from this and went on to reach the end of season play-off where they beat UCD over two legs in the First Division play-off to set up a play-off final date with Limerick who finished in 11th place in the League of Ireland Premier Division. Harps came from a goal behind in the first leg tie in Markets Field to win in dramatic fashion at Finn Park via a last minute BJ Banda winner, thus sending Horgan into Harps folklore by going from First Division also-rans to Premier Division side on one of the lowest budgets in the club's history in the space of just two seasons.

In October 2016, Finn Harps extended Horgan's contract as senior team manager until the end of the 2017.

Despite a promising start to the 2017 season, with wins over St Patrick's Athletic twice, Limerick, Bohemians, and a derby game in Maginn Park over Derry City, Harps late season run of form ended with a disappointing relegation back to the First Division for 2018 alongside Galway United and Drogheda United as the Football Association of Ireland changed structures again, relegating three teams from twelve to create two ten team divisions within the League of Ireland.

A period of uncertainty followed surrounding Horgans future as Harps manager but with issues resolved between board and manager, Horgan signed a new two-year deal with an option of an extra year with his first challenge assembling a squad who can compete for promotion in 2018.

The 2018 season saw Finn Harps finish in second place, and beat Drogheda United to qualify for the promotion/relegation playoff. Limerick were again the opposition, and again Harps secured promotion to the Premier Division, winning both legs of the playoff and holding Limerick scoreless. In the 2019 League of Ireland Premier Division Finn harps finished in 9th place qualifying for the relegation playoff in which they faced Drogheda United, Following a 1–0 defeat at United Park, Finn harps performed a massive comeback to survive relegation from the Premier Division in a dramatic game which went into extra time beating Drogheda 2–0 at Finn Park with a 107th-minute goal by Harry Ascroft.

In the 2020 League of Ireland Premier Division Finn Harps finished in 8th place, avoiding the relegation play-offs by 1 point. This season was disrupted by COVID-19 and so teams played half the games, 18 instead of the usual 36. The relegation went down to the final day with a 1–0 victory against Waterford securing their status in the premier division over Shelbourne who finished 9th and lost their play-off to Longford Town. Finn Harps started the 2021 League of Ireland Premier Division Season well being in first place for periods of time, however late form saw them drop off to the threat of the relegation play-off. However, on the Final Day of the season they beat Longford 5 - 0 and retained their Premier Division Status for the 2022 season.

Following relegation from the Premier Division, it was announced in November 2022 that Horgan had left the club by mutual consent, after 9 years at Finn Park.

Galway United (Assistant Manager) 
On 14 December 2022, Horgan was appointed as assistant manager at First Division club Galway United, his hometown club.

Personal life
Horgan is a schoolteacher by profession, working at St Eunan's College in Letterkenny as a physical education teacher. A pianist, originally from Galway, he is interested in Bach and Beethoven.

Managerial statistics

 1.Includes all competitive competitions.

Honours

Manager
Fanad United
 Ulster Senior League (3)

Finn Harps
 League of Ireland First Division Play-off (2): 2015 2018

References

1968 births
Living people
Association footballers from County Galway
Association footballers not categorized by position
Fanad United F.C. managers
Finn Harps F.C. managers
Irish schoolteachers
League of Ireland managers
People associated with St Eunan's College
Republic of Ireland football managers
Association football players not categorized by nationality